The Zwickau tramway network is a network of tramways forming part of the public transport system in Zwickau, a city in the federal state of Saxony, Germany.

Between Stadhalle and Zwickau Zentrum stations, Die Länderbahn operates mainline diesel services alongside trams, sharing two intermediate stations. This concept has been dubbed the "Zwickau Model".

Rolling stock
As of 2019, Zwickau operates a fleet of GT6M and Tatra KT4 trams. The procurement of new trams is in preparation.

See also
List of town tramway systems in Germany
Trams in Germany

References

Notes

Bibliography

External links

 
 
 UrbanRail.net

Zwickau
Transport in Saxony
Zwickau
Metre gauge railways in Germany
600 V DC railway electrification
Zwickau